Juling is a town in Linying County, Henan province, China. , it has 26 villages under its administration: 
Juling Village
Liuzhuang Village
Zhangzhuang Village
Mengzhuang Village
Louzhuang Village
Youfangchen Village
Lizhuang Village
Fangcheliu Village
Hanzhuang Village
Shiyuanwang Village
Taizhuang Village
Liangli Village
Yanglin Village
Daduan Village
Wulukou Village
Wujiqiao Village
Wangzhuang Village
Huanlong Village
Panzhuang Village
Guaizili Village
Mamiao Village
Guanjie Village
Yingwang Village
Qizhuang Village
Laimaizhang Village
Luoshanxin Village

See also 
 List of township-level divisions of Henan

References 

Township-level divisions of Henan
Linying County